The Archdeacon of Glasgow was the head of the Archdeaconry of Glasgow, a sub-division of the Diocese of Glasgow. He was one of two archdeacons serving the Bishop of Glasgow, the other one being the Archdeacon of Teviotdale. This archdeacon (Glasgow) was responsible for region of the Diocese of Glasgow outside the Teviotdale region of the Scottish Borders region. The position was an important position within the medieval Scottish church, because of the high number of parish churches in the archdeaconry.

List of archdeacons of Glasgow
 Ascelin, 1126 x 1127-1153 x 1159
 Enguerrand, 1161 x 1162-1164
 Simon, 1166 x 1174-1195 x 1196
 Robert, 1195 x 1196-1222
 Thomas, 1222
 Thomas de Contravel, 1222-1227
 Hugh de Potton, 1227-1238
 Matthew de Aberdeen, 1238 x 1244
 Reginald de Irvine, 1245-1266 x 1268
 William de Lindsay, 1275
 James de Dalileye 1306-1308 x 1311
 John Wishart, x 1310-1337
 Guido Kieretti, 1342-1374
 Gregory de Maybole (?), 1367-1387
 Thomas Mercer, 1374 x 1377 -1379 x 1388
 Duncan Petit, 1388-1397
 John de Grangia, x 1394
 Henry de Wardlaw, x 1394-1403
 William MacMorrin, x 1403
 Simon de Mandeville, 1403-1409
 William de Camera, 1403
 John Forrester, 1403
 John Forrester, 1409-1414
 William de Glendinning, 1409-1413
 John Stewart, 1413-1414
 George de Borthwick, 1414-1446
 John Arous, 1447 x 1448-1468
 Archibald Whitelaw, 1468
 Hugh 'Danslas', 1468
 Gilbert Rerik, 1468-149
 John Gibson, 1495
 Patrick Blackadder, 1502 x 1505-1521 x 1524
 Alexander Dick, 1523 x 1538-1559x1560
 John Abercrombie, 1562
 Andrew Betoun, 1560-1563 x 1573
 Archibald Douglas, 1573-1610
 Theodore Hay, 1610-1638

Notes

Bibliography
 Watt, D.E.R., Fasti Ecclesiae Scotinanae Medii Aevi ad annum 1638, 2nd Draft, (St Andrews, 1969), pp. 170–4

See also
 Archdeacon of Teviotdale
 Bishop of Glasgow

Glasgow
History of Glasgow
People associated with Glasgow
12th-century establishments in Scotland